Highway 963, also known as MacDonnell Lake Road, is a provincial highway in the Canadian province of Saskatchewan. It runs from Highway 913 until it transitions into Meeyomoot Road, a local road.

See also
Roads in Saskatchewan
Transportation in Saskatchewan

References 

963